The 2014 FC Tokyo season was the club's 14th year in existence and third consecutive season in the J.League Division 1, the top tier of Japanese football.

Players

Senior squad
As of February 6, 2014

Out on loan

J1 League

League table

Matches

References

External links
 J.League official site

FC Tokyo
FC Tokyo seasons